Michael Seneca Hawthorne (born January 26, 1977) is a former cornerback in the National Football League. He was drafted in the sixth round of the 2000 NFL Draft. In the NFL, he played for the New Orleans Saints, the Green Bay Packers, and the St. Louis Rams.

References

External links
Just Sports Stats

1977 births
Living people
Sportspeople from Sarasota, Florida
Players of American football from Florida
American football cornerbacks
American football safeties
Purdue Boilermakers football players
New Orleans Saints players
Green Bay Packers players
St. Louis Rams players
Tampa Bay Storm players